This is a list of Australian television events and premieres that are scheduled to occur in 2015, the 60th year of continuous operation of television in Australia.

Events

January

February

March

April

May

June

July

August

September

October

November

December

Channels

Channel launches
 1 February – Food Network, HGTV, Travel Channel (Fetch TV only)
 28 March – Foxtel Arts, Foxtel Movies Disney+2
 28 August – Racing.com (Free-To-Air)
 17 November – Food Network Australia
 26 November – 9Life, 9HD

Closed channels
 15 March – TVN
 28 March – STUDIO (replaced by Foxtel Arts)
 31 October – Bio.
 26 November – eXtra (replaced by 9Life)
 20 December – TVS

Renamed channels
 1 August – 111 (was 111 Greats)
 26 November – 9Go! (was GO! channel)
 26 November – 9Gem (was GEM Channel)

Deaths 
{|class="wikitable"
| Name
| Date
| Age
| Broadcast notability
| References
|-bgcolor=yellow
| Rod Taylor
| 8 January
| aged 84 
| Actor who starred in the American TV series Hong Kong, Bearcats!, and The Oregon Trail
| 
|-bgcolor=yellow
| Sarah Kemp 
| 9 January
| aged 77
| Actress best known for her role in soap opera Sons and Daughters as Charlie Bartlett.
| 
|-bgcolor=yellow
| James Walker 
| 24 January
| aged 41
| Screenwriter for numerous dramas including McLeod's Daughters, Home & Away and Neighbours.
|
|-bgcolor=yellow
|  Norman Yemm
| 5 February
| aged 82
| Theatre and television actor and sportsman<known for Number 96 as Harry Collins
| 
|-bgcolor=yellow
| Terry Gill 
| 25 February 
| aged 75
| British born Australian actor, star of Crocodile Dundee and soap opera The Flying Doctors, also portrayed Santa Claus at the annual TV broadcast of Carols by Candlelight
| 
|-bgcolor=yellow
| Stuart Wagstaff AM) 
| 10 March
| aged 90, 
| Theatre and television personality and entertainer, born in England
| 
|-bgcolor=yellow
| Michael Laurence 
| 23 March
| aged 79
| Television producer and scriptwriter, best known for television movie and serial Return to Eden
| 
|-bgcolor=yellow
| Richie Benaud
| 10 April
| aged 84
|  Wide World of Sports cricket commentator for the Nine Network.
| 
|-bgcolor=yellow
|  Betty Lucas 
| 27 April
| aged 90, 
| Australian theatre and television soap actress known for Prisoner, Taurus Rising and Richmond Hill.
| 
|-bgcolor=yellow
| Bob Hornery 
| 26 May
| aged 83 
| Actor from Neighbours who played Tom Kennedy 
| 
|-bgcolor=yellow
| John Pinder 
| 256 May
| aged 70, 
| Comedy producer, theatre producer/director and talent manager co-founder of the Melbourne International Comedy Festival and Circus Oz
| 
|-bgcolor=yellow
| Alan Bond
| 5 June
| aged 77, 
| English Australian businessman who previously owned the Nine Network
| 
|-bgcolor=yellow
| Yoram Gross 
| 23 September 
| aged 88 
| Polish Australian film producer, animation director and film studio owner, creator of the film adaptations of Blinky Bill, including Blinky Bill: The Mischievous Koala and Dot and the Kangaroo and its numerous sequels
| 
|-bgcolor=yellow
| Mike Gibson
| 23 September
| aged 75
| Australian television sports journalist and commentator, known for Nine's Wide World of Sports and Fox program The Back Page| 13 
|-bgcolor=yellow
| Sir James Cruthers 
| 13 October
| aged 90, 
| journalist, media pioneer and philanthropist
| 
|-bgcolor=yellow
|  Harry Butler  AO, OBE 
| 23 December 
| aged 85
| Environment conservationist, TV presenter In the Wild and Australian of the Year 1979
|
|-bgcolor=yellow
| Carol Burns 
| 21 December
| aged 68
| Actress and Queensland Theatre Company, best knownfor Ten Network series Prisoner as Freida "Franky" Doyle
| 
|}

Ratings
For the 2015 calendar year, the Seven Network had the highest consolidated metro ratings share with 29% of the audience. Channel Seven was the most watched primary channel (20.4% share) and 7Two was the most watched multichannel (4.7% share). Of the twenty most watched programs, 13 programs were sports coverage, including the most watched program being the 2015 AFL Grand Final with 2.64 million viewers. The highest rated non-sport program was the announcement of the seventh season winner of MasterChef Australia with 2.2 million viewers.

On subscription television, all but one of the top twenty most watched titles was sport, including the 2015 Cricket World Cup Final on Fox Sports 3, which topped the list with 616,000 viewers. The only non-sport program making the list was Game of Thrones which averaged 356,000 across its season.

 Premieres 

Domestic series

 International series 

 Telemovies and miniseries 

 Documentaries 

 Specials 

 Programming changes 

 Changes to network affiliation 
Criterion for inclusion in the following list is that Australian premiere episodes will air in Australia for the first time on a new channel. This includes when a program is moved from a free-to-air network's primary channel to a digital multi-channel, as well as when a program moves between subscription television channels – provided the preceding criterion is met. Ended television series which change networks for repeat broadcasts are not included in the list.

Free-to-air premieres
This is a list of programs which made their premiere on Australian free-to-air television that had previously premiered on Australian subscription television. Programs may still air on the original subscription television network.

Subscription premieres
This is a list of programs which made their debut on Australian subscription television, having previously premiered on Australian free-to-air television. Programs may still air (first or repeat) on the original free-to-air television network.

 Returning programs 
Australian produced programs which are returning with a new season after being absent from television from the previous calendar year.

 Endings 

 See also 
 2015 in Australia
 List of Australian films of 2015

 Notes 
Unconfirmed; filming postponed in August 2014.
Unconfirmed; in development as of September 2013.
Originally set to premiere in a previous year; auditions were announced in October 2012.
Unconfirmed; originally announced to air in 2013.
Originally aired as a segment on Seven Network's current affairs programme Sunday Night'', rather than a stand-alone series
Made its free-to-air premiere the following night on Network Ten.
The first two episodes premiered on Nine, and subsequent episodes premiered on Stan.
Originally scheduled to premiere on 31 January 2015.
Originally scheduled to premiere on 23 February 2015.
Originally scheduled to premiere on 19 February 2015.

References